Organa (Alpo-Morgan) was Kubrat's maternal uncle of the Ermi clan. According to John of Nikiu, he was regent (kavkhan) over the tribe of the Onogur Bulgars from 617 to 630 in place of his nephew, Kubrat, for the time Kubrat was growing up as a hostage in the Byzantine Empire. There is information that Organa accompanied Kubrat on his initial trip to Constantinople. Some historians have identified Organa with Gostun and Western Turkic Baghatur Qaghan (莫賀咄可汗 Mòhèduō Kèhán). Panos Sophoulis considered that Organa is in fact a Turkic title (or-ḡan/qan) rather than a proper name.

Honor
Organa Peak on Smith Island in Antarctica is named after Organa.

References

See also
 Nominalia of the Bulgarian khans

7th-century Bulgarian monarchs
7th-century rulers in Europe
Monarchs of the Bulgars
Regents
Christian monarchs